Lionel Conacher Jr. (born January 8, 1936) is a former running back in the Canadian Football League. He is the son of famed Canadian sports legend, Lionel Conacher.

A graduate University of Western Ontario, his selection in the university draft stirred up considerable controversy when the Toronto Argonauts passed him up for Bill Mitchell (who, incidentally, ended up being the 1960 rookie of the year).

Drafted by the Montreal Alouettes, Conacher's career was brief, totalling 6 games during the 1960 season.

His brother is Brian Conacher, a hockey player who represented Canada at the 1964 Winter Olympics and won a Stanley Cup with the 1967 Toronto Maple Leafs.

Roy Conacher and Charlie Conacher are Lionel's uncle.

Murray Henderson and Pete Conacher are Lionel's cousin.

References

1936 births
Living people
Ice hockey people from Toronto
Canadian people of Scottish descent
Players of Canadian football from Ontario
Canadian football running backs
Montreal Alouettes players
Western Mustangs football players